Pisoniano is a comune (municipality) in the Metropolitan City of Rome in the Italian region Lazio, located about  east of Rome.

Pisoniano borders the following municipalities: Bellegra, Capranica Prenestina, Cerreto Laziale, Ciciliano, Gerano, San Vito Romano.

Twin towns
 Sannat, Malta

References

External links
  

Cities and towns in Lazio